Ferdinando Vitofrancesco (born August 4, 1988) is an Italian professional footballer who plays as a defender for Casarano.

Club career
Vitofrancesco started playing in Milan's youth sector in 2000, at the age of 11.

On November 25, 2006, due to the large number of injuries suffered by various players, he got his first first-team call-up for a Serie A match against Messina. However, he didn't even manage to get a spot on the bench. He did three days later in a Coppa Italia game against Brescia, but eventually didn't enter the field.

In summer 2007 Vitofrancesco left for Cremonese in co-ownership deal for €5,000. In June 2008 the club purchased outright for an additional €70,000, made Milan booked the bonus of €65,000 as financial income.

In June 2011 he was signed by Serie B club Cittadella in exchange with Daniel Semenzato. He spent two years in Cittadella.

In 2013, he moved to Perugia.

In 2014, he was signed by Alessandria.

In July 2016 he left for Lecce.

On 7 September 2019, he joined Rende.

On 21 August 2020 he returned to Serie D with Lavello. He left Lavello on 30 December 2021 for fellow Serie D club Casarano.

References

External links
 
Profile at Assocalciatori.it 
 

1988 births
Sportspeople from Foggia
Living people
Italian footballers
Association football midfielders
A.C. Milan players
U.S. Cremonese players
F.C. Grosseto S.S.D. players
A.S. Cittadella players
A.C. Perugia Calcio players
U.S. Alessandria Calcio 1912 players
U.S. Lecce players
FeralpiSalò players
Serie B players
Serie C players
Serie D players
Footballers from Apulia